Mote Terukaio was a member of the Kiribati House of Assembly for the constituency of Nikunau.

References

Year of birth missing (living people)
Living people
Members of the House of Assembly (Kiribati)
Pillars of Truth politicians
People from the Gilbert Islands